Christ Crowned with Thorns may refer to:
Christ Crowned with Thorns (Bosch, London), a painting created after 1485 by Hieronymous Bosch
Christ Crowned with Thorns (Bosch, El Escorial)
Christ Crowned with Thorns (Bouts), a 1500 painting by Albrecht Bouts
Christ Crowned with Thorns (Heemskerck)

See also
Crown of Thorns
The Crowning with Thorns (disambiguation)